Mirfield is a civil parish in the metropolitan borough of Kirklees, West Yorkshire, England.  It contains 47 listed buildings that are recorded in the National Heritage List for England.  Of these, two are listed at Grade II*, the middle of the three grades, and the others are at Grade II, the lowest grade.  The list also includes two listed buildings outside the parish but in Mirfield ward; both of these are at Grade II.  The parish contains the town of Mirfield and the surrounding area.  Most of the listed buildings are houses and associated structures, cottages, farmhouses and farm buildings.  The Calder and Hebble Navigation and the River Calder pass through the parish, and the listed buildings associated with them are two locks, two lock keeper's cottages, a road bridge, and two railway bridges.  The other listed buildings include churches and items in or near churchyards, a railway underbridge, and a war memorial.


Key

Buildings

References

Citations

Sources

Lists of listed buildings in West Yorkshire